William Lawrence Rohter, Jr. (born February 3, 1950), known as Larry Rohter, is an American journalist who was a South American bureau chief (based in Rio de Janeiro, Brazil) for The New York Times from 1999 to 2007. Previously, he was Caribbean and Latin American correspondent of the Times from 1994 to 1999. He now writes about cultural topics.

Awards
In 1998, Rohter was awarded the Maria Moors Cabot Prize at Columbia University.
He was also awarded the Brazilian Embratel prize, as the "Melhor correspondente estrangeiro" (best foreign correspondent).

Personal
Rohter is married to Clotilde Rohter. They have 2 children. He lives today in Hoboken, New Jersey".

Criticism
Rohter published an article titled "Brazilian Leader's Tippling Becomes National Concern", insinuating the Brazilian president Luiz Inácio Lula da Silva had a drinking problem that affected his presidency, citing Mr. da Silva's former running mate Leonel Brizola, among others. The article caused consternation in the Brazilian press.  Rohter's visa was temporarily revoked (and quickly reinstated) by Brazil's government, an event which overshadowed much criticism of Rohter's reporting.

Publications

References

External links
 

1950 births
Living people
Maria Moors Cabot Prize winners
Writers from Oak Park, Illinois
Georgetown University alumni
American male journalists
The New York Times writers